Upeneus is a genus of goatfishes native to the Atlantic, Indian and Pacific oceans.

Species
These are the currently recognized species in this genus:

References

 
Mullidae
Marine fish genera
Perciformes genera
Taxa named by Georges Cuvier